The Blackout Crew, aka The Bards of Oldham, were a Donk/rap group consisting of six rap artists - Cover, Allison, Heaton, Davis, Kabbani and Chadwick - from Halliwell, Bolton, Greater Manchester. 

Their 2009 album peaked at No. 42 in the UK. Their album contained three singles: "Bbbounce", "Put a Donk on It", and "Dialled".

The lines "You know what you wanna do with that, right? You wanna put a bangin' donk on it" has frequently been used in the opening of the BBC Radio 2/BBC Radio 6 Music programme Radcliffe & Maconie, being generally favoured by Mark Radcliffe. Blackout Crew worked with electronic group Metronomy to provide a B-side remix for their 2008 single "A Thing for Me".

Members
Anthony Sabanskis (Producer)
 Jordan Cover (MC Cover)
 Kevin Allison (MC Dowie)
 Kurtis Chadwick (MC Viper)
 Tony Heaton (MC Raver)
 Rob Davis (MC Rapid)
 Zak Kabbani (MC Zak K)

The Blackout Crew's tracks were produced by Tony Sabanskis.

References

Further reading
Black Out Crew at VICE, retrieved 18 December 2014.

External links
The Blackout Crew official Facebook Page

English electronic music groups
Hip house music groups
English hip hop groups
Musicians from the Metropolitan Borough of Bolton
Musical groups from Greater Manchester